The Alta Mesa AVA is an American Viticultural Area entirely located within the Lodi AVA in Sacramento County, California in the United States.  The appellation's name is Spanish for "high table", a reference to the higher elevation of the land compared to the surrounding terrain.

Geography and climate
90% of the soil in the Alta Mesa AVA is dense clay and heavy gravel.  The appellation is known for warm summers, and low annual rainfall.  Alta Mesa is considered one of the warmest subregions of the Lodi AVA.

History
Federal recognition of the AVA occurred on July 17, 2006.

Vineyards
 of the appellation are planted to grapevines.  The most common grape varieties are Zinfandel, Syrah, Cabernet Sauvignon, Cabernet Franc, and Merlot.

Wineries
Vannatta Wine is an artisan, small-lot winery located within the Alta Mesa AVA.

References

American Viticultural Areas
American Viticultural Areas of California
Geography of Sacramento County, California
2006 establishments in California